Saob Leu is a village in Saob Commune, Preaek Prasab District, Kratie Province, Cambodia.

External links
 "A livelihoods study of farmers and fishers in Saob Leu Village, Kratie Province"

Villages in Cambodia
Populated places in Kratié province